Paramecia is a non-mineralized Ediacaran alga with a differentiated, compartmentalized thallus. This alga probably had multiple phases in its lifecycle,  as possible reproductive structures have been identified.

References

Fossil algae
Cambrian life
Corallinales